Panaitoliko (Greek: Παναιτωλικό) is a former municipality in Aetolia-Acarnania, West Greece, Greece. Since the 2011 local government reform it is part of the municipality Agrinio, of which it is a municipal unit. The municipal unit has an area of 105.976 km2. Population 1,386 (2011). The seat of the municipality was in Skoutera.

External links
Municipality of Panaitoliko

References

Populated places in Aetolia-Acarnania